Ed Hunter is a greatest hits album and video game released in 1999 by British heavy metal band Iron Maiden and Synthetic Dimensions. The game objective consists of following Iron Maiden's mascot, Eddie, through various levels depicting the band's past album covers. The accompanying CDs have the group's most popular songs, as selected by fans on the band's official website.

The album was released alongside a tour of the same name, in which the band only played songs which were featured in the compilation. The tour itself was also notable for marking the return of former guitarist Adrian Smith and vocalist Bruce Dickinson, who had left the band in 1990 and 1993, respectively.

Overview
The band's intention to release their own video game was announced in a sticker which appeared on the case of their 1996 compilation album, Best of the Beast, which stated, "Available soon... Melt, Eddie's own state-of-the-art 3D game." In September 1997, the band announced that the Melt project had been cancelled, with then vocalist Blaze Bayley commenting, "It was crap. Maiden want to give their fans something to blow them away. The new one will." The band also revealed that a different game would be released in its place, with Bayley commenting, "This game is nearly there. You've got to get to Eddie through time and space, heaven and hell..... the works ! It's a shoot 'em up which we promise will out-shoot`em all." Prior to its release, bassist Steve Harris commented that "it's the most amazing thing I've ever seen. I don't get shocked very often, but Ed Hunter was so good. It's like walking into a 3D version of the Somewhere in Time album cover, like going into the bar at the Ruskin Arms, only full of aliens and stuff. You go in and we'll be, like, holograms playing in the corner, or sitting at a table gambling. And then you've actually got the game itself, which is, like, this big shoot-'em-up chase through space and time to catch Eddie. It's brilliant." Originally slated for release in the Spring of 1998, the game was then pushed back to Christmas 1998 and eventually July 1999 to tie in with The Ed Hunter Tour.

The package includes 3 CDs. The first CD contains 14 songs, the second CD contains 6 songs and the installation program for the game, and the third CD contains the game data. The soundtrack consists of the top 20 songs voted for by Iron Maiden fans on the band's official website. The US version also contained a hidden bonus track of a new vocal version of "Wrathchild" with Bruce Dickinson.

The game passes through various levels, starting in London's East End before progressing to a psychiatric hospital, hell, and other various locations, all of which are lifted from the covers of past Iron Maiden albums. While the gameplay itself consists of shooting the appearing enemies with the mouse cursor, it acts as a rail shooter, meaning that the player has no control over movement apart from occasionally choosing the route he will take through the levels. In spite of this, the user can select which tracks play in the background, although only one song can be chosen for each level, which led to critics complaining about the soundtrack's repetitiveness.

The Ed Hunter Tour was the tour supporting the album and was the first tour with Bruce Dickinson on vocal duties since 1993, and with Adrian Smith on guitar since 1988.

Levels
London's East End (Killers)
The Shady Pines Asylum (Piece of Mind)
The Pits of Hell (The Number of the Beast)
The Graveyard (Live After Death)
The Pharaoh's Tomb (Powerslave)
Blade Runner (Somewhere in Time)
Futureal
Finale

Track listing

Personnel
Production credits are adapted from the album liner notes.
Iron Maiden
Steve Harris – bass guitar, producer (disc 1: tracks 5–7 and 9; disc 2: track 2), keyboards (disc 1: track 11; disc 2: track 2)
Dave Murray – guitar
Adrian Smith – guitar (all tracks excluding disc 1: tracks 5–7 & 9; disc 2: tracks 2, 3 & 6), keyboards (disc 1, track 11)
Bruce Dickinson – lead vocals (all tracks excluding disc 1: tracks 4, 5 & 9; disc 2: tracks 2–4)
Nicko McBrain – drums (all tracks excluding disc 1: tracks 3, 4 & 14; disc 2: tracks 1, 3 & 4)
Paul Di'Anno – lead vocals (disc 1: track 4; disc 2: tracks 3 & 4)
Clive Burr – drums (disc 1: tracks 3, 4 & 14; disc 2: tracks 1, 3 & 4)
Janick Gers – guitar (disc 1: tracks 5–7 & 9; disc 2: tracks 2 & 6)
Blaze Bayley – lead vocals (disc 1: tracks 5 & 9; disc 2: track 2)
Dennis Stratton – guitar (disc 2: track 3)
Additional musicians
Michael Kenney – keyboards (disc 1: tracks 5–7 & 9; disc 2: track 6)
Production
Martin Birch – producer (all tracks excluding disc 1: tracks 5 & 9; disc 2: tracks 2–3)
Nigel Green – producer (disc 1: tracks 5 & 9; disc 2: track 2)
Will Malone – producer (disc 2, track 3)
Simon Heyworth – mastering
Synthetic Dimensions – sleeve design and artwork
Ross Halfin – photography
Rod Smallwood – management
Andy Taylor – management
Merck Mercuriadis – management

Charts

Certifications

References

External links 
 Synthetic Dimensions

1999 video games
Video games based on musicians
Band-centric video games
Iron Maiden compilation albums
1999 compilation albums
EMI Records compilation albums
Heavy metal compilation albums
Rail shooters
Video games developed in the United Kingdom
Windows games
Windows-only games
Synthetic Dimensions games